The 1962–63 season was Aberdeen's 50th season in the top flight of Scottish football and their 52nd season overall. Aberdeen competed in the Scottish League Division One, Scottish League Cup, and the Scottish Cup

Results

Own goals in italics

Division 1

Final standings

Scottish League Cup

Group 3

Group 3 final table

Scottish Cup

References

AFC Heritage Trust

Aberdeen F.C. seasons
Aberdeen